Joseph Brenier (1876-1943) was a French politician. He served as the Mayor of Vienne from 1906 to 1919. He served as a member of the Chamber of Deputies from 1909 to 1914, and as a member of the French Senate from 1924 to 1933, representing Isère. He became a Knight of the Legion of Honour in 1935.

References

1876 births
1943 deaths
Politicians from Vienne, Isère
French Section of the Workers' International politicians
Members of the 10th Chamber of Deputies of the French Third Republic
Members of the 11th Chamber of Deputies of the French Third Republic
French Senators of the Third Republic
Senators of Isère
Mayors of places in Auvergne-Rhône-Alpes
French Freemasons
Chevaliers of the Légion d'honneur